Short track speed skating at the 2015 Winter Universiade was held at the Universiade Igloo, in Granada, from 11 to 13 February 2015.

Men's events

Women's events

Medal table

References

External links
Short track speed skating results at the 2015 Winter Universiade.
Results book

 
Short track speed skating
Winter Universiade
2015
Universiade